KAZO-LP, UHF analog channel 57, was a low-powered Azteca America-affiliated television station licensed to Omaha, Nebraska, United States. The station was owned by Pappas Telecasting. It was also formerly rebroadcast on KCAZ-LP channel 57 in Columbus, KAZJ-LP channel 46 in Norfolk, KWAZ-LP channel 56 in Lincoln and KAZS-LP channel 23 in South Sioux City. (By 2008 KWAZ-LP had moved to channel 35 and begun rebroadcasting KTVG instead of KAZO; this arrangement remained until January 2010 when KWAZ-LP was taken off the air.)

Prior to July 1, 2007, KAZO was affiliated with the Azteca America network. Before that, KAZO-LP was a repeater for KXVO. Pappas Telecasting terminated KAZO's affiliation agreement with Azteca America on July 1, 2007; after that date, KAZO became a part of Pappas' independent Spanish language network, TuVision.

In October 2008, Azteca America programming returned to Omaha and Sioux City on KXVO-DT2 15.2 and KMEG-DT2 14.2. Analog transmissions on KAZO-LP temporarily ceased around this time, though the analog channel 57 signal was again seen on the air in October 2009 rebroadcasting KXVO-DT2. KAZO-LP left the air for good later in fall 2009 and was no longer listed on KXVO-DT2 station ID screens. As late as 2008, KXVO-DT2 still identified the primary station on its ID screens as being KAZO-LP, though by 2009 it was instead identified locally as "MXVO".

The station was owned and operated by Pappas Telecasting, who at the time KAZO-LP signed off also owned KPTM, KPTH, and KHGI, as well as operated KMEG, KXVO and KFXL-TV through local marketing agreements.

On February 19, 2013, the FCC cancelled its license.

References

External links

Television stations in Omaha, Nebraska
Television stations in Nebraska
Television channels and stations disestablished in 2009
Defunct television stations in the United States
Television channels and stations established in 2007
2007 establishments in Nebraska
2009 disestablishments in Nebraska
Defunct mass media in Nebraska